Maarten de Bruijn (born 1965) is a Dutch engineer.

Born in  Naarden, he graduated in 1996 at University of Amsterdam with master's degree in City Planning. 1990-1996 he single-handed designed, constructed and made functional prototype Spyker Silvestris V8. 1999 he co-founded with Victor Muller company Spyker Cars for production of sport cars. Maarten de Bruijn designed and styled Spyker C8 Spyder (2000), Spyker C8 Laviolette (2001), Spyker C8 Double (2002). 2005 he leaves Spyker and co-found company Silvestris Haute Motive Concepts. In 2010 he was a guest speaker at Auto(r) automotive design conference.

References

1965 births
Living people
Dutch automobile designers
People from Naarden
University of Amsterdam alumni